Brown Chapel and variations may refer to:

Browns Chapel, West Virginia, an unincorporated community in Monongalia County
Brown Chapel A.M.E. Church (Selma, Alabama)
Brown Chapel A.M.E. Church (Pittsburgh, Pennsylvania)

See also
List of African Methodist Episcopal churches